Omalisus fontisbellaquaei is a species of beetle belonging to the family Elateridae.

These beetles are mainly present in Austria, Belgium, Bulgaria, France, Germany, Italy, Switzerland and in the Near East.

Their body is black, while elytra are reddish, with a longitudinal dark stripe. The larvae are bioluminescent and are predators of snails.

External links
 BioLib.cz
 Fauna Europaea

Elateroidea
Beetles of Europe
Beetles described in 1785